Rimosodaphnella semicolon is an extinct species of sea snail, a marine gastropod mollusk in the family Raphitomidae.

Description

Distribution
Fossils of this species were found in the Coralline Crag and Red Crag, Sutton, GB

References

 Wood, S.V. (1842). A catalog of shells from the Crag. Annals and Magazine of Natural History. (1) 9: 455–462; 527–544, pl. 5.

External links
 

semicolon
Gastropods described in 1842